Renata Sabljak (born 2 June 1977) is a Croatian film, theatre, voice actress and singer.

Biography 
Sabljak was born on 2 June 1977 in Zagreb to Nikola and Sanda Sabljak. She went to "Tituš Brezovački Gymnasium". She graduated from the Academy of Dramatic Arts of the University of Zagreb. She sang at the inauguration of first Croatia's female president Kolinda Grabar-Kitarović in February 2015.

Personal life 
She married Robert Prelec in 2008. They have twins; Borna and Luka.

Filmography

Film

Croatian voice-dub

References

External links 

Croatian film actresses
Croatian voice actresses
21st-century Croatian women singers
Croatian sopranos
1977 births
Living people
Actresses from Zagreb
University of Zagreb alumni